RPB may refer to:

 Racing Plast Burträsk, Swedish company
 Rally for the People of Burundi
 Reverse path broadcast, a routing method similar to reverse path forwarding
 Reverse penhold backhand, a grip in table tennis
  RPB subunits of RNA polymerase, encoded by POL genes